The following lists events that happened during 1985 in Rwanda.

Incumbents 
 President: Juvénal Habyarimana

Events

December
 December 26 - American naturalist Dian Fossey is murdered in her Rwandan cabin. It is still unknown who committed the murder.

References

 
Years of the 20th century in Rwanda
1980s in Rwanda
Rwanda
Rwanda